Prospect Heights Historic District is a historic district roughly bounded by Prospect Heights, Prospect, and Water Streets in Milford, Massachusetts. It encompasses a neighborhood that was created by the Draper Corporation of Hopedale, Massachusetts for its immigrant workers.  The district was listed on the National Register of Historic Places in 1990.

The community has a mix of different nationalities. Every year a new mayor is chosen to represent the community. There has been a mayor for every year starting in 1962, with a different background being represented each year: Portuguese, Irish, Italian, Greek, Armenian or Polish.

The Heights contains a World War II Memorial honoring local veterans who served in the war. The monument contains 184 names including one female, a nurse.

There is also the Portuguese Club, a soccer field, basketball courts, and a playground for children.

Every year the annual Portuguese Picnic is held drawing thousands every year. The new mayor also starts on the same day.

The motto of the heights is "No matter where you roam, Prospect Heights is still your home."

LIST OF PAST MAYORS:
1961-1962 Oracio Moreira - Portuguese
1962-1963 John Milan - Irish
1963-1964 Ardashes Krikorian - Armenian
1964-1965 Fred Crescenzi - Italian
1965-1966 John Chappel - Polish
1966-1967 George Alves - Portuguese
1967-1968 Jim Donlan - Irish
1968-1969 Hagop Papelian - Armenian
1969-1970 Joe Recchia - Italian
1970-1971 Thomas Tominsky - Polish
1971-1972 Joseph Lopes - Portuguese
1972-1973 Joseph McAuliffe - Irish
1973-1974 Joseph Derderian - Armenian
1974-1975 Dominik D'Amico - Italian
1975-1976 Joseph Oneschuk - Polish
1976-1977 Domenic Dias - Portuguese
1977-1978 John Coniaris - Greek
1978-1979 George Marashian - Armenian
1979-1980 Dante Viallani - Italian
1980-1981 Theodore Kosciak - Polish
1981-1982 Fernando Rodrigues - Portuguese
1982-1983 Joseph Evans - Irish
1983-1984 Carlos doCurral - Portuguese
1984-1985 John Villani - Italian
1985-1986 Nicholas Coniaris - Greek
1986-1987 Diego Chaves - Portuguese
1987-1988 Alfred Andreola Jr. - Greek
1988-1989 Daniel Ruggerio - Italian
1989-1990 Bento G. doCurral Jr. - Portuguese
1990-1991 Edward Bertorelli - Irish
1991-1992 Manoog Manoogian - Armenian
1992-1993 Agostina Lancia - Italian
1993-1994 Domingoes Pereira - Portuguese
1994-1995 John Wylie - Irish
1995-1996 Jeffrey Varteresian - Armenian
1996-1997 R. Allen Alves - Italian
1997-1998 David Soares - Portuguese
1998-1999 Albert Azevedo - Irish
1999-2000 Walter Costa - Armenian
2000-2001 Michael Tebeau - Italian
2001-2002 John Perry - Polish
2002-2003 John Fernandes - Portuguese
2003-2004 Gary Matos - Irish
2004-2005 John Derderian - Armenian
2005-2006 David A. Consigli - Italian
2006-2007 Joseph Batista - Portuguese
2007-2008 Thomas Cullen - Irish
2008-2009 Anthony C. Gonsalves - Italian
2009-2010 Alberto A. Correia - Portuguese
2010-2011 All the 50 living & deceased Mayors of the Heights!

LIST OF HONORARY MAYORS:
Scott Anderson
David Azevedo
Jose Batista
Manuel Chaves
Mike Consoletti
Antonio Coelho
Jose Coelho
Manuel Esteves
Manuel Gonsalves
Louis Hellmuth
Anthony Imbruno
Anthony Matheus
Manuel Matheus
Aurelio Matos
Frank Matos
Maurice Panagian
Rico Pisaro
John Silva
Sidney Smith
Joseph Soares
Dominic Alfonso

See also
National Register of Historic Places listings in Worcester County, Massachusetts

References

External links
List of Mayors

Historic districts in Worcester County, Massachusetts
Milford, Massachusetts
National Register of Historic Places in Worcester County, Massachusetts
Armenian-American culture in Massachusetts
Greek-American culture in Massachusetts
Irish-American culture in Massachusetts
Italian-American culture in Massachusetts
Polish-American culture in Massachusetts
Portuguese-American culture in Massachusetts
Historic districts on the National Register of Historic Places in Massachusetts